Coleophora salinoidella is a moth of the family Coleophoridae. It is found in Canada, including Nova Scotia.

The larvae feed on the seeds of Atriplex species. They create a trivalved, tubular silken case.

References

salinoidella
Moths of North America
Moths described in 1945